is a lay Zen sect derived from both the Soto (Caodong) and the Rinzai (Linji) traditions. It was renamed Sanbo-Zen International in 2014. The term Sanbo Kyodan has often been used to refer to the Harada-Yasutani zen lineage. However, a number of Yasutani’s students have started their own teaching lines that are independent from Sanbo Kyodan. Strictly speaking, Sanbo Kyodan refers only to the organization that is now known as Sanbo-Zen International.

History
Sanbō Kyōdan was founded by Hakuun Yasutani in 1954, when he "finally gave up his membership in the Sōtō School and professed himself to be connected directly to Dōgen Zenji." It is also called the "Harada-Yasutani School," in reference to Yasutani's teacher Harada Daiun Sogaku, a Sōtō priest who also studied with Rinzai priests. Both Harada Roshi and Yasutani Roshi were strong promoters of Zen practice for lay practitioners, and for people of other (non-Buddhist, non-Asian) faith communities and cultures. Their openness to lay practitioners was in line with the modernizing tendency of the Meiji Restoration, which began in 1868.  Starting in this period, various Zen institutions began to give permission to lay followers to practice Zen.

The leaders of the Sanbo Kyodan were involved in the contemporary social and cultural developments in Japan, which followed the abandonment of the medieval feudal system and its opening up to foreign influences and modern western technology and culture. The association of some of them with the fierce militaristic nationalism of the mid-20th century Empire of Japan has become controversial. Among Yamada Koun's friends and associates were Soen Nakagawa, a strong supporter of Japanese imperialism, and Yasutani Roshi's own position has been the subject of arguments. Within Japanese Buddhism, there was a development of Buddhist modernism, but also a tendency to support the autocratic regime in the interest of survival.

Influence

Western influence
Although the membership of Sanbō Kyōdan is small (3,790 registered followers and 24 instructors in 1988), "the Sanbō Kyōdan has had an inordinate influence on Zen in the West".

Westerners involved with Sanbō Kyōdan, including a number of Roman Catholics, promoted its teachings in North America and Europe in the latter half of the 20th century and early 21st century. One early American Zen member was Philip Kapleau, who published The Three Pillars of Zen, a work of compilation which was largely constructed by Yamada Koun, with help from Kubota Jiun, who together provided rough translations that were later polished by Philip Kapleau, who also wrote some introductions to sections. The three men together edited the book, which appeared in 1965 under Kapleau's name. Kapleau studied under Harada Sōgaku in Obama and Yasutani Haku'un in greater Tokyo in the 1950s and 1960s, but never received formal dharma transmission, and started his own lineage. Other influential teachers who studied with Yasutani and started their own organizations included Taizan Maezumi and Robert Baker Aitken, although most of Aitken's training was under Koun Yamada. In Europe, the Sanbō Kyōdan was associated particularly with Roman Catholic practitioners such as Hugo Enomiya-Lassalle and others.

Yasutani's lineage has grown rapidly, constituting one of the largest Zen networks in the United States, although some of Yasutani's disciples, and disciples of his successor Yamada Koun, have left the Sanbo Kyodan and started their own organisations.

Charismatic authority
The Sanbō Kyōdan was also influential in introducing charismatic authority in Western Zen, by its dependency on the authority of Yasutani, while simultaneously standing outside the mainstream of Japanese Zen. It was transplanted into a culture that is unaware of the specific characteristics of Japanese culture regarding authority. The stress on kenshō as means of authority, coupled to the primacy of maintaining the correct dharma transmission, led to institutional problems when Yasutani's heir Yamada Koun died, in the view of some disaffected former members. Shortly before his death in 1989 Yamada Koun passed on the leadership of the Sanbo Kyodan directly to Kubota Jiun Roshi, who was its abbot until 2004, whereupon the abbacy passed to Yamada Ryoun Roshi. While a handful of Western teachers authorized by Sanbo-Zen left the organization, some 40 or so remain within it, and the institution itself has evolved and shows signs of growing strength and resilience. The direct lineage of the “Three Clouds” (Harada, Yasutani and Yamada) maintains a strong core and trunk in today's Sanbo-Zen. Seeing one's nature gives an autonomous confirmation of Zen's ultimate truth, which may conflict with the need to maintain institutions and traditions. On the other hand, it may foster a renewal and revitalization of the core of Zen teaching, and allow for styles of Zen practice to emerge that are more relevant to non-Japanese contexts.

Yasutani and Japanese imperialism

Yasutani's support for the Pacific War was criticized after World War II. The publication of Brian Victoria's Zen at War led to a public apology by Kubota Jiun, the third Abbot of Sanbō Kyōdan.

See also 
 Buddhism in the United States

Notes

References

Sources

Printed sources

 
 
 
 
 
 
 The Eastern Buddhist 39/1: 61–120

Web sources

Further reading
 Koun Yamada (2004) The Gateless Gate, Wisdom Publications. 
 Koun Yamada (2015) Zen: The Authentic Gate, Wisdom Publications. 
 Philip Kapleau, The Three Pillars of Zen
 Peter Matthissen, Nine-headed Dragon River
 Brian Daizen Victoria (2006), Zen at War. Lanham e.a.: Rowman & Littlefield Publishers, Inc. (Second Edition)

External links 
 
 Yasutani Hakuun Roshi — a biographical note
 Sanbo Kyodan teachers and heirs. Database needs some updating.

 
Rinzai school
Soto Zen